The Socialist is the weekly paper of the Socialist Party. Founded in 1964 under the name Militant, it styled itself as the "Marxist voice of Labour and Youth" and played an important role in bringing together a strong left-wing grouping within the British Labour Party, so much so that the group came to be known as the Militant tendency after the newspaper they sold and read. In 1997, Militant Labour (successor to the Militant tendency) changed its name to the Socialist Party, and the Militant newspaper was renamed the Socialist the same year.

It is edited and written by the members and supporters of the political party publishing it. Sold by its members, it is a non-profit paper, carrying news and reports from around the country and from overseas.

See also
The Socialist (Irish newspaper)
The Socialist (Australian magazine)
Scottish Socialist Voice

References

External links
Online edition

Committee for a Workers' International
Communist newspapers
Political newspapers published in the United Kingdom
Publications established in 1964
Socialist newspapers published in the United Kingdom
Socialist Party (England and Wales)
Weekly newspapers published in the United Kingdom
1964 establishments in the United Kingdom